Muniria lanceolata is a flowering plant in the mint family Lamiaceae and is endemic to Arnhem Land in the Northern Territory. It is a shrub with its branches and leaves densely covered with a layer of short, greyish, branched hairs and red flowers near the ends of the branches.

Description
The branches, leaves and some of the flower parts are densely covered with short greyish, branched hairs. The leaves are dark green, and wrinkled on the upper surface.

The flowers are surrounded by bracts which are similar in size and shape to the leaves and by smaller bracteoles. The tube is densely woolly on the outside but mostly glabrous inside except for a narrow ring of hairs around the ovary and a few hairs on the largest petal lobe. The four stamens reach past the end of the tube, the lower pair longer than the upper ones. Flowering occurs in most months and is followed by fruit which is oval-shaped but with four distinct ridges and hairy at one end.

Taxonomy and naming
This species was first formally described in 1979 by Ahmad Abid Munir from a specimen collected near Oenpelli (present day Gunbalanya). It was given the name Pityrodia lanceolata and the description was published in Journal of the Adelaide Botanic Gardens. In 2011, Barry Conn, Murray Henwood and Nicola Streiber described a new genus, Muniria and transferred this species to it. The specific epithet (lanceolata) is a Latin word meaning "lancelike".

Distribution
This species only occurs in Arnhem Land where it is found in Nitmiluk National Park.

Conservation
Muniria lanceolata is classified as "least concern" under the Territory Parks and Wildlife Conservation Act.

References

External links
Muniria lanceolata occurrence data from Australasian Virtual Herbarium
 
 

lanceolata
Plants described in 1979
Flora of the Northern Territory